Harley Fox (born 13 January 1996) is an Australian rugby union player. He plays in the blindside flanker and number 8 for the Melbourne Rebels. In July 2017 it was published that he was joining 2015–16 Pro12 Champions Connacht Rugby, On 11 September 2017 it was confirmed.

Early life
Fox grew up in Ipswich, Queensland playing rugby league for the Brothers Rugby League Club Ipswich as a junior and attended Primary School at Raceview State school located in Ipswich. He grew up playing league in Ipswich at the highest level for his age group, coming from a town which has produced players such as Allan Langer and Kevin Walters. Fox represented Queensland in two sports, Rugby League and Rugby Union, at under 16 and under 18 ages.

Fox attended St Edmunds College in Ipswich, where he took part in a variety of sports, including cricket and baseball. Fox transferred to Anglican Church Grammar School in Brisbane to take up a rugby union scholarship and was coached and mentored by now Under 20s Queensland Reds coach Jason Gilmore. In September 2014 he was named captain of the Australian Schoolboys team. He led the team on a tour to Wellington, New Zealand in September and October 2014, which featured a 50–15 win over the Fiji Schoolboys team. His successful switch of codes from league to union in a short time and becoming captain of the national schoolboy team has been described as "remarkable". Fox is currently contracted to the Melbourne Rebels in the 2017 Super Rugby season.

Professional career

Queensland Reds
Fox received a contract for the Queensland Reds and the Australian Rugby Union under-20 program for the 2015 season. He was named to the Queensland under-20 representative squad for the national championships in March 2015.

Melbourne Rebels
In October 2015, Fox was signed by the Melbourne Rebels to their extended squad for the 2016 Super Rugby season.

Connacht Rugby
In September 2017, Irish Pro14 side Connacht announced that Fox was joining its three-year academy program ahead of the 2017–18 season. Fox is not Irish qualified, but having signed ahead of changes to the World Rugby regulations around international qualification, which come into effect in the 2018–19 season, Fox would be eligible to represent Ireland after three years of residency.

Super Rugby Statistics

References

Melbourne Rebels players
Connacht Rugby players
Living people
1996 births
Australian rugby union players
Rugby union flankers
Rugby union number eights
Australian expatriate rugby union players
Expatriate rugby union players in Ireland
Melbourne Rising players
Rugby union players from Ipswich, Queensland